Hay Creek Township is a civil township in Burleigh County in the U.S. state of North Dakota. As of the 2020 census, its population was 4,293.

The township is part of the Bismarck-Mandan metropolitan area.

History
A small rural community with the name Hay Creek sprang up in this township in the 1890s. Since that time, the city of Bismarck has absorbed much of the township, including the remnants of the community of Hay Creek.

Demographics

References

Townships in Burleigh County, North Dakota
Populated places established in the 1890s
Townships in North Dakota